Fred Goldstein is a leader of an American Workers World Party. He is a member of the Secretariat, a six-member leading body of Workers World Party. He is a contributing editor of Workers World, and frequently writes economic analysis for the paper. Goldstein is the author of the book Low Wage Capitalism: Colossus With Feet of Clay, recently published by World View Forum.

External links 
 Book Website
 Low Wage Capitalism Blog
 Workers World Newspaper
 Video Series:The Capitalist Economic Crisis and the Fight Back: A Revolutionary Marxist View

Workers World Party politicians
Living people
American Marxists
American communists
Year of birth missing (living people)